Kgomotso Balotthanyi is a Botswanan Olympic middle-distance runner. He represented his country in the men's 1500 meters at the 1984 Summer Olympics. His time was a 3:58.69 in the first heat.

References 

1956 births
Living people
Botswana male middle-distance runners
Olympic athletes of Botswana
Athletes (track and field) at the 1984 Summer Olympics